Sodbuster was a program created by Title 12 of the Food Security Act of 1985 designed to discourage the plowing up of erosion-prone grasslands for use as cropland.  If such is used for crop production without proper conservation measures as laid out in a conservation plan, a producer may lose eligibility to participate in farm programs. In the 1990 Farm Bill, it was amended and became the super sodbuster, such that producers became ineligible for specified farm program benefits on all their land if they cultivated highly erodible land that was idle. The super sodbuster was repealed by the 1996 Farm Bill.

References 

Law of the United States
Nature conservation in the United States
Soil in the United States